Fiskales Ad-Hok are a punk band from Santiago de Chile, formed in the late '80s. Its initial lineup consisted of Alvaro España on vocals, Roly Urzúa on bass, "Polo" on drums, "Cyril" on guitar and "Pogo"- who would go on to become the lead singer of his own band Los Peores de Chile – on guitar and vocals. Their album Fiesta was included in the list of the 50 greatest Chilean albums according to Rolling Stone (Chile).

Biography

Beginnings 
"Fiskales Ad-Hok" is one of the first bands for the "Chilean Punk movement". How late this movement started in Chile can find an explanation that since 1973 Chile was under control of a "military dictatorship", like many Latin American countries. In this climate of extreme political and social tension is that this group is forged as a response to an authoritarian government. The "Fiskales Ad-Hok" name refers to one count of the same dictatorship, the military prosecutor of ad hoc, which was occupied at the time by General Fernando Torres Silva. It had its first performance in 1987 at the 1st Biennial organized by Vicente Ruiz Underground. This event was organized as a tribute to the lead singer of punk band The Dada also known by the nickname "TV Star", who was also the author of the band name Fiskales Ad-Hok. Thus, this year released their first demo Fiskales, with help from Carlos Cabezas, entitled Matarratas, where you can find the first official records of songs like "stupid cops" and "Anarkia and rebellion". During these years the band is faced with the problem of not being able to have a stable, having an intense members come and go, especially on drums and guitar, unable to solve this problem until the early 90s.

Consecration (1991–1999) 
In 1991 they finally achieved a stable income with the grouping of the Argentine bassist Marcelo Larralde "Viper", which features the band met guitarist and new drummer Michael Jackson as "Micky" Cumplido.

The great opportunity for Fiskales Ad-Hok be proven before a large audience came in 1992, when they opened in Santiago de Chile of The Ramones, during the tour of South America, which gave the group initiator American punk movement. This was the turning point where the group became known by a lot of people and not only for those in the reduced circuit gigs, this is how the big record companies in Chile were interested in this group, offering opportunity to record an album under the wing of a stamp. It was not until 1993 that "Fiskales Ad-Hok" released his first studio album, self-titled, under the independent label "Baton Records". This album contains 14 tracks with new songs and its previous demo, including songs like "Ranchera", "Borracho", "Libertad Vigilada" and the cover of the Chilean band Los Prisioneros "Pa pa pa".

For 1995 Fiskales Ad-Hok launches new work with several new features. On the one hand, this album was made under the seal "Culebra Records", a subsidiary of BMG – a multinational record company-with which the band did not feel comfortable leaving it after this experience. Meanwhile, in the album titled Swallow the band includes a new theme more emotional, with songs like "No estar aquí", "Fuga" and "Eugenia", without neglecting the harsh social criticism, political and economic relationship that characterizes, which is reflected in "downstream", in honor of the Mapuche people, and "El circo", an outspoken critic of the political class.
In 1997 the group decided to create his own independent label to solve the problem of finding spaces in which to develop their work without pressure of any kind, in addition to feel comfortable with your work environment. Thus was born the seal CFA (Phonographic Corporation Autonomous), by which in 1998 launched the album titled Fiesta, this work being accused of being the highest quality of all their discography, which allowed them to realize successive tours including Europe. This album has 15 songs, among which include "Caldo e` caeza",  "Fiesta", "Odio", "Al puerto", "Cuando muera" and "Resistiré" (cover version of Spanish group "Dúo Dinámico"), between others.

Last years (since 2000) 
In 2000, the band recorded a cover of "La Cultura de la Basura", for the tribute album to Los Prisioneros. Months later, the group published a new material called now. This time corresponds to a recorded disc recorded live in April at the local "La Batuta". This album consists of 22 items and included in his previous works, plus two bonus track, subjects performed in conjunction with the Chilean band La Pozze Latina. It is on this record where the drummer "Memo" makes its debut in the band. Also this year on their first European tour, which takes 8 countries (Germany, Netherlands, Belgium, Switzerland, Italy, Austria, Czech Republic and Poland), where he played in a circuit of social and squatting houses and achieved great recognition part of the European punk scene.

In 2001, on the occasion of the departure of one of its members nicknamed "Viper", who decide to migrate to Europe, "Fiskales Ad-Hok" is invited to the radio show "Raras tocatas Nuevas" radio station "Rock and Pop" Chilean subsidiary to make a live presentation. Among the 18 subjects who performed, highlighted a lot of cover songs performed by the band that are not recorded in any record, among which may be named "Let's Lynch the Landlord" (lynch the owner of lokal) of Dead Kennedys, "Pet Cemetery"  original The Ramones or also "Hybrid Moments" by The Misfits.

The fourth studio album the band arrive in 2001 under the name Calavera album with 20 new songs that maintains the theme of the above in terms of lyrical, not in terms of sound, which leads to not being able to repeat of all the success with his previous records. After this album the band decided to take a break as a band to pursue other personal projects.

In 2004 he released a new compilation album called Antología, being a mix of new releases and live recordings of themes for previous deliveries, further comprising a video for "Fiesta". In this same year he premiered the documentary "Malditos la Historia de los Fiskales Ad-Hok", by Pablo Insunza, which tells the story of the group since its early years, with the story of both the individual band members belonging all formations, as well as people close to the band especially its beginnings as Carlos Cabezas, Jorge Gonzalez and Rolando Ramos, among others. The exhibition of documentary film in various film festivals achieves further expand the popularity of the band. Also perform their second European tour, this time also leads to France and Spain, where much recognition achieved by force of his lyrics.

In October 2006 the band started to celebrate his 20 years. The celebration began with a new program participation "Raras tocatas nuevas" radio station "Rock and Pop" This time the band performed 18 songs, including some unpublished later included in his next album. Celebrating 20 years of the group took place on 9 October 2006 with a massive concert with the participation of invited bands like "Curasbún", "La Floripondio", "Kalibre 38" and the band celebrated Argentina Dos Minutos.

In April 2007 launched the fifth plate "Fiskales Ad-Hok" study nice moment against chaos, an album where the theme of social discontent is kept alive, as his predecessors aggressive and very well structured in their lyrics. The official launch took place on 28 April in a concert which featured guest bands like The Floripondio, Entreklles, Subject, and the Argentine group secret spies. On 15 April of that year the band lived another milestone in his career to take on the opening of one of the three scenarios "Chile Vive Latino Festival 2007", which had a public frame of 50,000.

During 2008, Fiskales Ad-Hok devoted himself to promote his DVD presentation that celebrated the 20th anniversary of the band. Also began working on what would be two new albums: one with original songs and one solo versions of other artists, mainly associated with the punk and new wave of the late 70s and early 80s. This latest album, titled 12 because it brings that many songs, was finally released in mid-2009.

In October 2009 and with the Brazilians Sepultura, Faith No More telonean at "Estadio Bicentenario de La Florida".

On 10 October 2011 celebrated its 25th anniversary with a concert at the Teatro Caupolican with "The Sore Losers", Doble Fuerza, La Floripondio, Curasbún, Chico Trujillo, Insurgents and the legendary band "The KK".

Discography 
 Studio albums
 Matarratas (1987, Indie)
 Fiskales Ad-Hok (1993, La Batuta)
 Traga (1995, BMG)
 Fiesta (1998, CFA)
 Calavera (2001, CFA)
 Antología (2004, CFA)
 Lindo Momento Frente Al Caos (2007, CFA/Oveja Negra)
 12 (2009, CFA)
 El flagelo (2019, CFA)
 Demos
 Por Fin Llegó El Indulto (1988, Indie)

 Live albums
 Ahora'' (2000, CFA)

External links 
 Fiskales Ad-Hok en MySpace
 Página oficial del sello Corporación Fonográfica Autonoma (C.F.A.)

Chilean punk rock groups
Musical groups established in 1986
1986 establishments in Chile